FK Radnički Svilajnac is a football club based in Svilajnac, Serbia. They compete in the Serbian League East, the third tier of the national league system.

History
The club started competing in the newly formed Serbian League Timok in 1995. They finished as runners-up in the NATO bombing-suspended 1998–99 season and gained promotion to the Second League of FR Yugoslavia. The club spent three seasons in the second tier, competing in Group East from 1999 to 2002. In 2003, they were relegated to the Pomoravlje Zone League, the fourth tier of Serbia and Montenegro football. The club would win the title in the 2004–05 season and earn promotion to the Serbian League East.

Between 2009 and 2019, the club spent 10 consecutive seasons in the Serbian League East. They marked their 80th anniversary in 2018. After placing first in the Zone League West in the COVID-19-suspended 2019–20 season, the club was promoted back to the third tier of Serbian football.

Honours
Pomoravlje Zone League / Pomoravlje-Timok Zone League / Zone League West (Tier 4)
 2004–05 / 2008–09 / 2019–20

Seasons

Notable players
This is a list of players who have played at full international level.
  Vladan Radača
For a list of all FK Radnički Svilajnac players with a Wikipedia article, see :Category:FK Radnički Svilajnac players.

Managerial history

References

External links
 
 Club page at Srbijasport

1938 establishments in Serbia
Association football clubs established in 1938
Football clubs in Serbia